Brutovo is a rural locality (a selo) in Pavlovskoye Rural Settlement, Suzdalsky District, Vladimir Oblast, Russia. The population was 321 as of 2010. There are 13 streets.

Geography 
Brutovo is located 31 km southwest of Suzdal (the district's administrative centre) by road. Ovchukhi is the nearest rural locality.

References 

Rural localities in Suzdalsky District
Vladimirsky Uyezd